The Bay–Calauan–San Pablo Road is a national primary road that connects the municipality of Bay to the city of San Pablo. It is also known as Mariano Marfori Avenue in Calauan and Lt. Cosico Avenue in San Pablo. It forms part of National Route 67 (N67) of the Philippine highway network.

Intersections

References 

Roads in Laguna (province)